Raymond Escholier, real name Raymond-Antoine-Marie-Emmanuel Escolier, (25 December 1882 – 19 September 1971) was a French journalist, novelist and art critic. He was curator of the Maison de Victor Hugo and of the Petit Palais.

Bibliography 
Novels and short stories
1924: Le Sel de la terre, Éditions Malfère
1925: Quand on conspire, Éditions Grasset
1928: Mahmadou Fofana, Crès
1930: L’Empereur aux yeux bleus, Albin Michel, in collaboration with Clément Vautel
1931: L'herbe d'amour, Albin Michel, 1931.
1933: Sang Gitane, Laboratoire Deglaude, 1933.
1935: Maripepa, Albin Michel, 1935.

Theatre
1908: Madame de Luzy, one-act play, after a short story by Anatole France
1931: La Conversion de Figaro, 3 acts and one epilogue, 1931, in collaboration with Jean-Jacques Brousson
1931: Cantegril, four-act opéra comique, 1931, music by Jean Roger-Ducasse
1974: Goya, three-act opera, music by Tony Aubin

Essays

1909: Vers l’autre rive, Messein
1913: Essais d’art, de littérature et d’histoire : Le Nouveau Paris, Nillson
1913: Daumier, Éditions Floury
1926: Victor Hugo, le peintre, l’artiste, Crès
1926–1927–1928 Delacroix, Floury, 3 volumes
1928: La Vie glorieuse de Victor Hugo, Plon
1930: Logis romantiques, Horizon de France
1930: Versailles, Alpina
1932: Souvenirs parlés de Briand, Hachette
1933: Mes Pyrénées, Arthaud
1933: Victor Hugo par ceux qui l’ont connu, Stock
1933: La Place royale et Victor Hugo, Fernand Didot
1933: Delacroix et sa consolatrice, Colin
1935: Constantinople, Alpina
1935: Victor Hugo et les femmes, Flammarion
1935: L’Art italien, Floury, Catalogue de l’exposition du Petit Palais
1936: Gros, ses amis, ses élèves, Catalogue de l’exposition du Petit Palais
1937: La peinture française au XX, Floury, 1 volume
1937: Greco, Floury
1937: Henri Matisse, Floury
1938: Hôtel-Dieu, Laboratoire Cida
1941: La Peinture française au XIX, Floury, 3 volumes
1945: Maquis de Gascogne, collection « Documents d'aujourd'hui » issue IV, Geneva, Éditions du Milieu du Monde
1951: Victor Hugo, cet inconnu, Plon
1952: Un amant de génie, Victor Hugo, Plon
1956: Matisse, ce vivant, Fayard
1957: La Neige qui brûle : Marie Noël, Fayard
1962: Mes Pyrénées de Gavarnie au Canigou, Arthaud
1963: Eugène Delacroix, Édition du centenaire, Cercle d’Art 
1963: Delacroix et les femmes, Fayard
1965: Daumier et son monde, 
1972: Hugo, roi de son siècle, Fayard

Magazines
Raymond Escholier collaborated with the following newspapers and magazines:
Mercure de France ; Gazette des Beaux-Arts ; Correspondant ; Revue des deux Mondes ; Revue des Vivants ; Le Figaro littéraire ; L'Illustration ; Nouvelles Littéraires ; Vient de paraître ; Tableaux de Paris ; La Dépêche de Toulouse ; Arts ; Arts et Médecine ;  ; Journal ; Petit Journal ; Temps ; Le Monde Illustré ; Revue du Languedoc ; Revue du Tarn ; Gai Saber ; Revue de Paris ; Revue Hommes et Mondes.

Direction of series
 1924–1925: "Demain"
 1936–1946: "Les Arts de la Bibliothèque Artistique", éditions Floury

Works in common with Marie-Louise Escholier
1919: Dansons la Trompeuse, Grasset, (Prix Northcliffe). 
1921: Cantegril, Grasset, (Prix Femina – Vie Heureuse).
1923: La Nuit, Grasset
1925: Quand on conspire, Grasset
1925: Le Chaudron de cuivre, Éditions de la Cité
1929: Gascogne, Horizon de France
1931: L’Herbe d’amour, Albin Michel, (Grand prix de Littérature de l’Académie française).
1936: Au pays de Cantegril, Ferenczi
1952: Le Secret de Montségur, in collaboration with Maurice Gardelle, Éditions de la Colombe, 1952.

Works by Marie-Louise Escholier
1986: Les Saisons du vent, journal août 1914-mai 1915, Carcassonne, Garae / Hésiode.

References

Sources 
 Bernadette Contenson (under the direction of), Paris 1937, L’Art indépendant, Musée d'Art Moderne de la Ville de Paris, Catalog of the exhibition presented as part of the fiftieth anniversary of the International Exhibition of Arts and Techniques in Modern Life, from 1 June to 30 August 1937, Paris, 1987, 259 pages.
 André Ducasse, Jacques Meyer, Gabriel Perreux, Vie et mort des Français, 1914-1918, Paris, Hachette, 1959, 547 pages;  : La Guerre et les Écrivains. 
 Exposition de l’Art italien de Cimabue à Tiepolo, mai-juin-juillet 1935, Catalogue, Petit Palais, 1935, XLV + 526 pages and volume of 172 plates, prefaced by RaymondEscholier.
 Jean Hugo, Le Regard de la Mémoire, Actes Sud, 1983.
 Raymond Lécuyer, "Les maîtres de l’Art indépendant" au Petit Palais, in Le Figaro, Sateday 19 June 1937.
 Bernadette Truno-Vidal, Raymond et Marie-Louise Escholier, de l’Ariège à Paris, un destin étonnant, Essai, Éditions Trabucaire, Canet-en-Roussillon, 2004, 221 pages.

External links 
 Some photos of Raymond Escholier

1882 births
Writers from Paris
1971 deaths
Lycée Henri-IV alumni
Lycée Condorcet alumni
French art historians
French art critics
20th-century French journalists
20th-century French dramatists and playwrights
Prix Femina winners
Grand Officiers of the Légion d'honneur